"Cool Kids" is the debut single song by American indie pop band Echosmith from their 2013 debut studio album, Talking Dreams. The song was written by Echosmith, Jeffery David, and Jesiah Dzwonek. It was produced by Mike Elizondo, with additional production on the radio edit by Rob Cavallo. "Cool Kids" was originally released on May 31, 2013, as the iTunes Store Single of the Week and officially impacted United States radio the following year. The song subsequently became a sleeper hit, peaking at number 13 on the Billboard Hot 100 and receiving airplay on US modern rock, hot adult contemporary, and contemporary hit radio stations.

Background
The song describes a boy and a girl who both desire to be noticed. In an interview, guitarist Jamie Sierota discussed the song's background, saying: "This cry to be like the cool kids… it's something that everyone kind of goes through whether you want to act like it or not... There's always somebody out there that you kind of wish, 'If only I could do this, or do that.' I think that's why it connects with people so well."

Composition

"Cool Kids" is written in the key of F minor, and follows a chord progression of Fm–D♭–A♭–E♭ (i–VI–III–VII). The tempo of the song is 129 beats per minute.

Music video
The song's official music video was filmed in Los Angeles, California and directed by Gus Black. It was released on June 21, 2013, on Echosmith's official YouTube channel. After the original video passed one million views, Echosmith released an acoustic version of the song. The band also released a new music video for "Cool Kids" on September 11, 2014, directed by Mark Pellington.

Commercial performance
"Cool Kids" debuted at number 87 on the Billboard Hot 100 for the issue dated July 26, 2014 and peaked at number 13. The song also reached the top ten of the Billboard Mainstream Top 40 and Adult Top 40 charts, peaking at numbers 9 and 5 respectively. It was certified gold by the Recording Industry Association of America on October 4, 2014, and passed the one million sales mark later on in the same month. As of December 2014, it has sold over 1.1 million copies in the United States. "Cool Kids" also peaked at number 6 on the Australian singles chart and was certified double platinum in the country.

Track listing

Charts

Weekly charts

Year-end charts

Certifications

Release history

References

2013 debut singles
2013 songs
Warner Records singles
Echosmith songs
Song recordings produced by Rob Cavallo
Songs written by Jamie Sierota